Magnus Egilsson (born 19 March 1994) is a Faroese footballer who plays as a left-back for B36 Tórshavn and the Faroe Islands national team.

Career
Egilsson made his international debut for the Faroe Islands on 8 September 2019 in a UEFA Euro 2020 qualifying match against Spain, which finished as a 0–4 away loss.

Career statistics

International

References

External links
 
 
 
 Magnus Egilsson at FaroeSoccer.com

1994 births
Living people
Faroese footballers
Faroese expatriate footballers
Faroe Islands youth international footballers
Faroe Islands under-21 international footballers
Faroe Islands international footballers
Association football midfielders
Havnar Bóltfelag players
Argja Bóltfelag players
Valur (men's football) players
B36 Tórshavn players
Faroe Islands Premier League players
1. deild players
Faroese expatriate sportspeople in Iceland
Expatriate footballers in Iceland
People from Tórshavn